Qalibaf-e Sofla (also Romanized as Qālībāf-e Soflá; also known as Qālībāf-e Pā’īn) is a village in Firuzeh Rural District, in the Central District of Firuzeh County, Razavi Khorasan Province, Iran. At the 2006 census, its population was 204, in 48 families.

References 

Populated places in Firuzeh County